Shara is a rural locality (a selo) in Laksky District, Republic of Dagestan, Russia. The population was 715 as of 2010. There are 7 streets.

Geography 
Shara is located 8 km south of Kumukh (the district's administrative centre) by road, on the Kunnul River. Khurkhi and Tulizma are the nearest rural localities.

Nationalities 
Laks live there.

References 

Rural localities in Laksky District